Women's Basketball Club Sparta&K is a women's basketball team based in Vidnoye, Russia that plays in FIBA’s EuroLeague Women.

History
It won the 2005–06 EuroCup Women and the 2006–07, 2007–08, 2008–09 and 2009–10  EuroLeague Women championship and two SuperCup Women. It is currently the only team that has won 4 consecutive EuroLeague Women titles since 1991 when European Cup For Women's Champions Clubs was rebranded as the Euroleague Women.

This is due in part to the team's supplementing of its otherwise Russian roster with seasoned WNBA American and other stars Lauren Jackson, Sue Bird, Diana Taurasi, Tamika Catchings, Anete Jēkabsone-Žogota, and others.

In 2010, the club was renamed to Sparta&K after the sports society Spartak were against the usage of the brand "Spartak" in December 2009. The last letter is devoted to murdered basketball sponsor Shabtai Kalmanovich.

Winners
FIBA Europe SuperCup Women: (2)
  2009, 2010

EuroLeague Women: (4)
  2007, 2008, 2009, 2010

EuroCup Women: (1)
  2006

Russian Women's Basketball Premier League: (2)
  2007, 2008

Current roster

Former players

  Marina Karpunina
  Ilona Korstin
  Marina Kuzina
  Irina Osipova
  Seimone Augustus
  Sue Bird
  Tamika Catchings
  Candice Dupree
  Sylvia Fowles
  Janel McCarville
  Diana Taurasi
  Tina Thompson
   Becky Hammon
   Epiphanny Prince
  Lauren Jackson
  Isabelle Yacoubou
  Sonja Petrović
  Elisa Aguilar
  Anete Jēkabsone-Žogota
  Jelena Milovanović
  Jelena Škerović
  Tijana Ajduković

References

External links
Official site
FIBA team page

Women's basketball teams in Russia
Sport in Moscow Oblast
Spartak Moscow
EuroCup Women-winning clubs
EuroLeague Women clubs
Basketball teams established in 1949